Tide is the seventh album by Antônio Carlos Jobim, released in 1970 on A&M Records and arranged by Deodato.

Track listing
All tracks written by Antônio Carlos Jobim except where noted.

 "The Girl from Ipanema" (Vinicius de Moraes, Norman Gimbel, Antônio Carlos Jobim) – 4:53
 "Carinhoso" (Pedro Berrios, João de Barro, Pixinguinha) – 2:49
 "Tema Jazz" – 4:36
 "Sue Ann" – 3:05
 "Remember" – 4:04
 "Tide" – 4:06
 "Takatanga" – 4:44
 "Caribe" – 2:44
 "Rockanalia" – 4:48

Bonus tracks on CD reissue
"Tema Jazz" [Alternate Take] – 2:58
 "Tide" [Alternate Take] – 4:09
 "Tema Jazz" [Alternate Take] – 5:49
 "Tema Jazz" [Master Take in Full] – 8:15

Personnel
 Antônio Carlos Jobim – piano, electric piano, guitar
 Jerry Dodgion – alto saxophone solo (1)
 Marvin Stamm, Burt Collins – trumpet
 Hubert Laws, Romeo Penque – flute
 Hermeto Pascoal – flute solo (3)
 Joe Farrell – flute, bass flute (2, 8), soprano saxophone solo (8)
 Joseph DeAngelis, Ray Alonge – French horn
 Garnett Brown, Urbie Green – trombone
 Ron Carter – double bass
 João Palma – drums
 Everaldo Ferreira – congas
 Airto Moreira – percussion
 Deodato – piano, arranger, conductor

Strings
Frederick Buldrini, Max Polikoff, David Nadien, Matthew Raimondi, Harry Katzman, Emanuel Green, Harry Lookofsky – violin
Al Brown, Harold Coletta – viola
Charles McCracken, George Ricci – cello

References

1970 albums
Albums arranged by Eumir Deodato
Albums produced by Creed Taylor
Albums recorded at Van Gelder Studio
Antônio Carlos Jobim albums
A&M Records albums
Instrumental albums